Angevillers (Lorraine Franconian Aasler, German: Arsweiler) is a commune in the Moselle department in Grand Est in northeastern France.

Population

See also
 Communes of the Moselle department
 Ouvrage Rochonvillers, a Maginot Line fortification

References

External links
 

Communes of Moselle (department)